Szőlősgyörök is a village in Somogy county, Hungary.

The settlement is part of the Balatonboglár wine region.

History
According to László Szita the settlement was completely Hungarian in the 18th century.

External links 
 Street map (Hungarian)

References 

Populated places in Somogy County